Westport is an unincorporated community and census-designated place on the Columbia River in Clatsop County, Oregon, United States. As of the 2010 census, it had a population of 321.

Westport is connected to Cathlamet, Washington, across the river via the Wahkiakum County ferry to Puget Island. U.S. Route 30 passes through the community, connecting it to Astoria to the west and Clatskanie to the east.

Westport is named after "Captain" John West, a millwright and lumberman who settled in the area in the early 1850s. West was a native of Scotland, emigrated to Canada as a young man where he worked in a sawmill on the St. Lawrence River and then came to Oregon via California during the gold rush of 1849. West ran a sawmill and a salmon cannery in the community. The Westport post office was established in 1863 with West was its first postmaster.

Demographics

References

Unincorporated communities in Clatsop County, Oregon
Unincorporated communities in Oregon
Census-designated places in Clatsop County, Oregon
Census-designated places in Oregon
1863 establishments in Oregon
Populated places established in 1863
Oregon populated places on the Columbia River